Tsse (Ꚑ ꚑ; italics: Ꚑ ꚑ) is a letter of the Cyrillic script. The shape of the letter originated as a ligature of the Cyrillic letters Te (Т т Т т) and Es (С с С с. Its form resembles a T with an ogonek attached on its bottom.

Tsse was used in the Abkhaz language, where it represented the labialized alveolo-palatal ejective affricate . It is a Cyrillic letter corresponding to Ҵә.

Computing codes

See also 
Ҵ ҵ : Cyrillic letter Te Tse
Cyrillic characters in Unicode

Cyrillic letters